Kanagaratnam or Canagaratnam is a Tamil male given name. Due to the Tamil tradition of using patronymic surnames, it may also be a surname for males and females.

Notable people

Given name
 A. Canagaratnam (born 1873), Ceylonese lawyer and politician
 K. Kanagaratnam (1892–1952), Ceylonese politician
 M. Canagaratnam (1924–1980), Ceylonese politician
 Sathasivam Kanagaratnam (born 1946), Sri Lankan politician
 S. O. Canagaratnam (1880–1938), Ceylonese politician
 Vinthan Kanagaratnam, Sri Lankan politician

Surname
 Aaryan Dinesh Kanagaratnam (born 1981), Sri Lankan musician
 Kanagaratnam Sriskandan (1930–2010), Ceylonese engineer
 Kanagaratnam Thavalingam, Sri Lankan geographer

See also
 
 

Tamil masculine given names